Jeanne Cressanges, real name Jeanne Mouchonnier (born 6 May 1929 in Noyant-d'Allier (Allier) is a French screenwriter, dialoguist, essayist, and novelist.

Biography 
Jeanne Cressanges was born in a modest family of the Bourbonnais. Her paternal family was a family of plasterers-painters from Dompierre-sur-Besbre, Her maternal family was a peasant family of Noyant-d'Allier. Her father, Jules Mouchonnier, worked for the railways. She grew up in Saint-Sornin, in the Bourbonnaise countryside.

Between 1960 and 1970, she was a reader at Éditions Julliard and a columnist at Les Nouvelles littéraires. In 1968, she moved to Épinal, to follow her husband. The Vosges department was the setting for several of his novels, like Les Eaux rouges and Le Luthier de Mirecourt.

Works 
 Novels
1959: La Femme et le manuscrit, Éditions Grasset
1962: La Feuille de bétel, Casterman. 
1963: Le Cœur en tête, Casterman - Prix de la ville de Vichy 1964
1967: La Part du soleil, Julliard
1969: La Chambre interdite, Julliard
1973: Mourir à Djerba, Éditions Denoël
1984: La Mariée de Saint-Médard, Flammarion - Jeanne Cressanges was host of Bernard Pivot in Apostrophes for this novel
1988: Les Eaux rouges, F. Bourin - Jeanne Cressanges was host of Bernard Pivot in Apostrophes for this novel
1995: Les Trois Naissances de Virgine, Julliard - Prix Allen
1997: Un Amour de 48 heures, Flammarion
1999: Le Luthier de Mirecourt, Denoël
2002: Les Ailes d'Isis,  - Feuille d'or de la ville de Nancy
2005: Le Soleil des pierres, Le Cherche midi - Prix Erckmann-Chatrian
2019: Un père en héritage, S. Domini éd.
 Essays
1976: Les chagrins d'amour, Grasset
1979: La vraie vie des femmes commence à quarante ans, Grasset
1982: Ce que les femmes n'ont jamais dit, Grasset - Jeanne Cressanges was host of Bernard Pivot in Apostrophes for this essay
1986: Parlez-moi d’amour, Flammarion
1992: Seules  François Bourin
 Tale
1995: La Petite Fille aux doigts tachés d'encre, Flammarion
 Short stories
2012: Soledades, Ed. du Murmure
2014: Rencontres, Ed. du Murmure
2016: Entre deux sourires, S. Domini éd.
 Trivia
2009: Je vous écris d'Épinal, S. Domini éd.
2011: Je vous écris du Bourbonnais. S. Domini éd. - Prix Allen
2014: Mes Vosges. Itinéraires amoureux, S. Domini éd.
 Cinematographic adaptations, scenarios and dialogues
1968: L'Étrangère, film by Sergio Gobbi, in collaboration with the director
1969: Maldonne, film by Sergio Gobbi, in collaboration with the director
1969: , film by Sergio Gobbi, in collaboration with the director
1970: Delphine, film by Éric Le Hung, in collaboration with the diretor

References

Bibliography

External links 

 Jeanne Cressanges, invitée par Bernard Pivot (Apostrophes).
 Site de l'INA. Extrait de son entretien avec Jacques Chancel (1979).
 

1929 births
People from Allier
20th-century French novelists
21st-century French novelists
French women novelists
French women short story writers
21st-century French short story writers
French women screenwriters
French screenwriters
20th-century French essayists
Living people
21st-century French women writers
20th-century French women writers